Hanging Around or similar titles may refer to:

Hanging Around (film), a 1996 film by Damien Hirst
Hangin'-A-Round, the 2006–07 FIRST Vex Challenge game

Songs
"Hangin' Around" (Big Brovaz song), 2006
"Hanging Around" (The Cardigans song), 1999
"Hanging Around" (Gemma Hayes song), 2002
"Hanging Around" (The Stranglers song), 1977
"Hanginaround", a 1999 song by Counting Crows
"Hanging Around", by Basement from Promise Everything
"Hanging Around", by Me Me Me
"Hanging Around", by Mood Six
"Hanging Around", by The Spencer Davis Group from Living in a Back Street
"Hangin' Around", by Trudy Richards
"Hangin' Around", written by Ted Varnivk and Nick Acquaviva
"Hangin' Around", by the Edgar Winter Group from They Only Come Out at Night
"Hanging Around", by Charli XCX from Sucker